Golam Sarwar Hiru is an Islami Oikya Jote politician and the former Member of Parliament of Barguna-2.

Career
Hiru was elected to parliament from Barguna-2 as an Islami Oikya Jote candidate in 1996. In the 7th Jatiya Sangshad session, he was the sole representative of Islami Oikya Front. He was threatened with expulsion for breaking party discipline.

References

Islami Oikya Jote politicians
Living people
7th Jatiya Sangsad members
Year of birth missing (living people)